Lepet (Javanese), Leupeut (Sundanese), or Lepat (Indonesian) is a type of sticky rice dumpling mixed with peanuts cooked with coconut milk and packed inside a janur (young coconut leaf) or palm leaf. It is a delicacy commonly found in Javanese and Sundanese cuisine (of Java, Indonesia), and often consumed as a snack. It is similar to lontong, but with a stickier texture and richer flavor due to the use of coconut milk and peanuts.

Lepet is made by steaming the ketan (sticky rice) until half cooked in coconut milk then mixed with pandan leaf and salt  until all of the coconut milk is absorbed into the sticky rice. Then the half-cooked coconut milk sticky rice is mixed further with grated coconut flesh and peanuts then wrapped inside janur (young yellowish coconut leaf) in a cylindrical-shape and secured with strings made from coconut leaf fibers (or any kind of strings). The rice packages inside the coconut leaf are then steamed further until completely cooked. The most common filling is peanuts, however other kinds of beans such as kidney beans, cowpeas, jack beans, or corn might also be used. 

Other than sticky rice, lepet can be made from corn as well, which is similar to tamale.

In the Sundanese area of West Java, it is known as leupeut and usually made in a smaller size with peanut filling and usually consumed with tahu sumedang (fried tofu). It is a popular snack in the Kuningan and Sumedang Regency.

In Sumatra, Indonesia and the Malay Peninsula there is a similarly named food known as lepat, although the recipe and method are slightly different as lepat uses palm sugar and grated coconut flesh fillings which are wrapped inside a banana leaf instead of a young coconut leaf.

See also 

 Burasa
 Ketupat
 Lemang
 Lemper
 Lontong
 Suman
 List of dumplings
 List of steamed foods

References

External links 
 Sundanese Leupeut recipe (in Indonesian)

Indonesian rice dishes
Steamed foods